Stenocoelium is a genus of flowering plants belonging to the family Apiaceae.

Its native range is Central Asia to Siberia and Western and Southern Central China.

Species:

Stenocoelium athamantoides 
Stenocoelium depressum 
Stenocoelium popovii 
Stenocoelium trichocarpum

References

Apioideae
Apioideae genera